Sheikh Haji Muhammad Saleh (Tambusai, Rokan Hulu, Riau, 5 November 1784 – Negeri Sembilan, Malaysia, 12 November 1882) is one of the Islamic leaders for the padri movement. Tuanku Tambusai, as he was well known in Indonesia was one of the leaders who fought the colonial invaders during the Padri Wars in 1838 along with his contemporaries, Tuanku Imam Bonjol and Tuanku Rao.

Biography 
His real name is Muhammad Saleh. He was born in Dalu-dalu a village in Tambusai on 5 November 1784. Muhammad Saleh is the son an Islamic teacher from Minang homeland in western Sumatera. His father came from village called Rambah. His father was appointed by the Sultan of Riau as the chief imam and married a local women, called Munah. His mother, Munah came from a village in Tambusai called Kandang Kopuh.

Early life 
Muhammad Saleh was brought up by his father who was the Chief Imam during the rule of the Sultanate of Riau in the 1800s. During his childhood, his father has taught him martial arts and horseback riding. Muhammad Saleh also seek his knowledge from Islamic scholars in Bonjol and Rao. He was also inspired by the understanding of salaf from the teaching of Muhammad ibn Abdul Wahab during his time in Mecca. Muhammad Saleh became the leader of the Padri movement in Tambusai and was granted the title by Tuanku Tambusai, meaning, Lord of Tambusai, by the Sultan.

1784 births
1882 deaths
Indonesian Muslims
People from Riau
Minangkabau people
Military history of Indonesia
National Heroes of Indonesia
Padris